Old Mansion, originally named "The Bowling Green" by the original landowners, the Hoomes family, is a historic home located in Bowling Green, Caroline County, Virginia. The house was built around 1741.  The original front section is a -story, brick structure with a jerkin-head roof and dormers.  A rear frame addition with a gambrel roof was added in the late 18th century.  The building is a private residence.

It was listed on the National Register of Historic Places in 1969. Bowling Green lent its name to the town of Bowling Green, Virginia. It is included in the Bowling Green Historic District.

See also
List of the oldest buildings in Virginia

References

External links

Old Mansion, State Route 2 vicinity, Bowling Green, Caroline County, VA: 8 photos, 16 measures drawings, and 8 data pages at Historic American Buildings Survey

Historic American Buildings Survey in Virginia
Houses on the National Register of Historic Places in Virginia
National Register of Historic Places in Caroline County, Virginia
Houses completed in 1670
Houses in Caroline County, Virginia
Individually listed contributing properties to historic districts on the National Register in Virginia
1670 establishments in Virginia